Aleksandr Ksenofontov (born 5 May 1999) is a Belarusian professional footballer who plays for Torpedo-BelAZ Zhodino on loan from the Russian club Rodina Moscow.

References

External links 
 
 

1999 births
Living people
Belarusian footballers
Belarus youth international footballers
Belarus under-21 international footballers
Association football midfielders
FC Dinamo Minsk players
FC Chist players
FC Vitebsk players
FC Torpedo-BelAZ Zhodino players
Belarusian Premier League players
Belarusian First League players
Russian First League players
Russian Second League players
Belarusian expatriate footballers
Expatriate footballers in Russia
Belarusian expatriate sportspeople in Russia